Irina Devina (born 8 May 1959 in Zhukovsky, Moscow Oblast Russia SSR, Soviet Union) is retired Soviet rhythmic gymnast who has competed both as an individual and in group. She is a (1979, 1977) World Champion in Group all-around and won the 1981 USSR Championships in all-around.

Career 
Devina was an elegant and technical gymnast who started gymnastics at 6 years of age. She is twice World Champion as member the Soviet group that won the all-around gold in 1977 and 1979 (in Basel and London).

She began competing as an individual at the beginning of the 1980s, a time of the uprise and domination of the Golden Girls of Bulgaria of her generation (Iliana Raeva, Anelia Ralenkova, Lilia Ignatova, Diliana Gueorguieva) limiting her competitive victories, nevertheless Devina won gold in ribbon at the 1981 World Championships and finished 4th in all-around, the highest ranked Soviet. She also came in 4th in all-around at the 1982 Europeans. In 1983, Devina competed with teammate Dalia Kutkaitė at the inaugural World Cup Final held in Belgrade, she took two bronze medals in hoop and ribbon.

Devina won the 1981 USSR Championships in all-around ahead of silver medalist Venera Zaripova, she also won the all-around silver at the 1982 USSR Championships held in Tallinn behind Dalia Kutkaitė.

After completing her competitive career, Devina married famous Soviet Olympic Pentathlon athlete, Vasily Neffedov. She now lives in Moscow, Russia and briefly taught as a coach being a holder of Honored Master of Sports of the USSR.

Influence 
Devina was the first rhythmic gymnast to perform a penché pivot turn.

References

External links
 
 

1959 births
Living people
Soviet rhythmic gymnasts
Russian rhythmic gymnasts
Medalists at the Rhythmic Gymnastics World Championships
People from Zhukovsky, Moscow Oblast
Sportspeople from Moscow Oblast